The Clyde River is a river of New Zealand, one of Canterbury's braided rivers. It is formed from the confluence of the Frances River and McCoy Stream, flowing southwest to join with the Havelock River and Lawrence River to form the Rangitata River.

See also
List of rivers of New Zealand

References

Rivers of Canterbury, New Zealand
Braided rivers in New Zealand
Rivers of New Zealand